Maryino is a rural locality (a village) in Kolchugino, Kolchuginsky District, Vladimir Oblast, Russia. The population was 45 as of 2010. There are 4 streets.

Geography 
Maryino is located on the Peksha River, 6 km north of Kolchugino (the district's administrative centre) by road. Otyayevka is the nearest rural locality.

References 

Rural localities in Kolchuginsky District